Polysorbate 20 (common commercial brand names include Kolliphor PS 20,  Scattics, Alkest TW 20, Tween 20, and Kotilen-20) is a polysorbate-type nonionic surfactant formed by the ethoxylation of sorbitan monolaurate. Its stability and relative nontoxicity allows it to be used as a detergent and emulsifier in a number of domestic, scientific, and pharmacological applications. As the name implies the ethoxylation process leaves the molecule with 20 repeat units of polyethylene glycol; in practice these are distributed across 4 different chains, leading to a commercial product containing a range of chemical species.

Food applications
Polysorbate 20 is used as a wetting agent in flavored mouth drops such as Ice Drops, helping to provide a spreading feeling to other ingredients like SD alcohol and mint flavor.

The World Health Organization has suggested acceptable daily intake limits of 0–25 mg of polyoxyethylene sorbitan esters per kg body weight.

Biotechnical applications
In biological techniques and sciences, polysorbate 20 has a broad range of applications. For example, it is used:
 as a washing agent in immunoassays, such as Western blots and ELISAs. It helps to prevent non-specific antibody binding. In this major application, it is dissolved in Tris-buffered saline or phosphate buffered saline at dilutions of 0.05% to 0.5% v/v. These buffers are used for washes between each immunoreaction, to remove unbound immunologicals, and eventually for incubating solutions of immunoreagents (labeled antibodies) to reduce nonspecific background. 
 to saturate binding sites on surfaces (i.e., to coat polystyrene microplates, generally combined with proteins such as BSA).
 to stabilize proteins purified protein derivative (PPD) solution used in skin testing for tuberculosis exposure
 as a solubilizing agent of membrane proteins
 for lysing mammalian cells, at a concentration of 0.05% to 0.5% v/v, generally combined with other detergents, salts and additives.

Pharmaceutical applications
Polysorbate 20 is used as an excipient in pharmaceutical applications to stabilize emulsions and suspensions.

Industrial and domestic applications

Polysorbate 20 is used in many brands of baby wipes. 

Polysorbate 20 is used by philatelists to remove stamps from envelopes and to remove residues from stamps, without harming the stamp itself.

Polysorbate 20 is also used as wetting agent in rubber balers in the elastomer industry.

Polysorbate 20 has been used as a shape directing agent to synthesize spheroidal magnetite nanoassemblies.

See also
 Polysorbate 80

References

External links
 Tween 20 on biologists' wiki OpenWetWare

Non-ionic surfactants
Excipients
Laurate esters
E-number additives